Evgeny Lapenkov (born August 1, 1984) is a Russian professional ice hockey winger who is currently playing for HSC Csíkszereda in the Erste Liga, having last played for Severstal Cherepovets of the Kontinental Hockey League (KHL). He has previously played with HC Spartak Moscow in the 2010–11 season. During the 2014–15 season, after scoring 1 goal in 10 games with Avtomobilist Yekaterinburg, Lapenkov was traded to inaugural club, HC Sochi on October 2, 2014.

References

External links

1984 births
Living people
Ak Bars Kazan players
Avtomobilist Yekaterinburg players
Lokomotiv Yaroslavl players
Metallurg Novokuznetsk players
HC Neftekhimik Nizhnekamsk players 
Severstal Cherepovets players
HC Sochi players
HC Spartak Moscow players
Traktor Chelyabinsk players
HC Yugra players
HC Vityaz players
Russian ice hockey right wingers